The 1930–31 Scottish Cup was the 53rd staging of Scotland's most prestigious football knockout competition. The Cup was won by Celtic who defeated Motherwell in the replayed final.

Fourth round

Semi-finals

Final

Replay

Teams

See also 
 1930–31 in Scottish football
 1933 Scottish Cup Final (played between same teams)

References

External links
 Video highlights from official Pathé News archive

Scottish Cup seasons
Scot
Cup